The Santiago Qualifying Grand Prix 2009 was the sixth qualifying Gliding Grand Prix for the FAI World Grand Prix 2008.

External links 
 https://www.youtube.com/watch?v=WMoTQH-RpZw
 https://web.archive.org/web/20080511231854/http://www.fai.org/gliding/QSGP0809

Gliding competitions
International sports competitions hosted by Chile
Gliding in Chile
2009 in Chilean sport
2009 in air sports